Terminal City Ricochet is a 1990 film directed by Zale Dalen. The name was taken from a hockey team called the Terminal City Ricochets.

Starring Jello Biafra (of the Dead Kennedys), Terminal City Ricochet is a dystopian comedy critical of television and its collusion with government and consumerism. Terminal City Ricochet is well known in cult film circles, but it has only been shown at film festivals, and a few times on pay-TV.
The DVD combo, (containing both the DVD of the film and a CD of the movie soundtrack) has been made available through the Alternative Tentacles Website. It was released in stores in October 2010.

Cast
Mark Bennett as Alex Stevens
Peter Breck as Ross Glimore
Germain Houde as Ace, the Savior
Jello Biafra as Bruce Coddle
Lisa Brown as Beatrice
Gabe Khouth as Jim Glimore
Marcel Masse as Wino
Nelson K. Skalbania
Joe Keithley as Cop
Gene Kiniski as Cop

Production
The film had a budget of $2.8 million with $1.8 million coming from Telefilm Canada, $500,000 from BC Film, $500,000 from private investments, and $388,000 in deferrals.

Soundtrack
The soundtrack (released by Alternative Tentacles) features many punk bands including Nomeansno, Jello Biafra, D.O.A., The Beatnigs and others.

References

Works cited

External links
[ Terminal City Ricochet soundtrack at Allmusic.com]

 Terminal City Ricochet at AlternativeTentacles.com

Punk films
1990 films
Canadian black comedy films
Canadian independent films
Dystopian films
1990s black comedy films
English-language Canadian films
Films directed by Zale Dalen
1990 comedy films
1990s English-language films
1990s Canadian films